Midlunga railway station is a railway station located on the Outer Harbor line. Situated in the north-western Adelaide suburb of Osborne, South Australia, it is 18.8 kilometres from Adelaide station.

History 

The station was opened in 1921.

Just north of Midlunga station, the line merges into a single track for the final  to Outer Harbor. The line was reduced to a single track in the early 1980s.

Services by platform

References

External links

Railway stations in Adelaide
Railway stations in Australia opened in 1921
Lefevre Peninsula